Govabin (also Romanized as Govābīn and Gavābīn; also known as Gavāpen and Kovābīn) is a village in Rudhaleh Rural District, Rig District, Ganaveh County, Bushehr Province, Iran. At the 2006 census, its population was 344, in 70 families.

References 

Populated places in Ganaveh County